Trine Trulsen Vågberg (born 19 April 1962 in Drøbak, Norway) is a Norwegian curler. She won a silver medal at the 1989, and a bronze medal at the 2002 World Curling Championships.

Trulsen Vågberg is the twin sister of Pål Trulsen, Olympic curling champion at the 2002 Winter Olympics, and is married to her brother's team member Lars Vågberg from the same Olympic Games.

References

External links
 

1962 births
Living people
Norwegian female curlers
People from Frogn
Sportspeople from Bærum
Olympic curlers of Norway
Curlers at the 1988 Winter Olympics